Saavedra is a barrio or neighbourhood of Buenos Aires, Argentina. It is located in the Northern end of the city, close to Nuñez and Villa Urquiza. Its northern border is Avenida General Paz. Among the main features of the neighbourhood is the Parque Saavedra, which has large picnic areas and sports facilities. Many inhabitants of Buenos Aires pass through Saavedra en route to their weekends in the country.

The neighbourhood's most famous son is tango singer Roberto Goyeneche. Also, it was the cradle of Platense football club. The main characters of Adolfo Bioy Casares's novel El Sueño de los Héroes live in Saavedra.

The interchange between the Pan-American Highway and Avenida General Paz is at Saavedra's northern end. Points south were the site of extensive demolition during the late 1970s tenure of military-appointed Mayor Osvaldo Cacciatore, who planned a network of new expressways including one through Saavedra, one of the city's most residential barrios. Never built, the demolished stretch was converted into Avenida Roberto Goyeneche. Saavedra is also home to an important Philips manufacturing facility, as well as the Dot Baires Shopping Center, the city's largest.

Gallery

External links

 Saavedra community newspaper
 Barrio de Saavedra facts
  Barrio de Saavedra facts
 history of Saavedra
 Historical dates

References

Neighbourhoods of Buenos Aires